Kimberley Shaylor (born 15 June 1981) is a former English female rugby union player. She represented  at the 2006 Women's Rugby World Cup. She and Nicola Crawford retired from international rugby after the 2006 World Cup. She retired so that she could study medicine at Birmingham University.

References

External links

1981 births
Living people
England women's international rugby union players
English female rugby union players
Female rugby union players